Tyendinaga (Mohawk) Airport  is a registered aerodrome that is open to the public and caters mainly to general aviation.

History
Originally known as Deseronto Airport, the field opened in 1917 as a training school for pilots during World War I. During World War II, it hosted the No. 1 Instrument Navigation School for the British Commonwealth Air Training Plan, providing advanced instrument-navigation training to air crews. During this time, the airport was also used as the primary relief landing field for the Central Flying School, based out of RCAF Station Trenton.

The aerodrome is currently the site of the First Nations Technical Institute and the First Nations Flying School.

Historical aerodrome information
The field was listed as "all hard surfaced" and had three runways listed as follows:

References

External links
 Airport home page
 Page about this airport on COPA's Places to Fly airport directory

Registered aerodromes in Ontario
Airports of the British Commonwealth Air Training Plan
Military airbases in Ontario
Military history of Ontario